Chon Kye-young (born December 10, 1970) is a South Korean manhwa author. One of Korea's most popular graphic novelists since her debut in 1996, her major works include Unplugged Boy (1997), Audition (1998), Girl in Heels (2007–2010) and Beautiful Man. Her recent series Love Alarm (2014–present), considered the biggest hit since her debut, is being adapted into a television series of the same name.

Works
Unplugged Boy (1997)
Audition (1998)
DVD (2003–2005)
Girl in Heels (하이힐을 신은 소녀, 2007–2010)
Beautiful Man
Love Alarm (좋아하면 울리는, 2014–present)

Screen adaptations
Audition (animated film, 2009)
Bel Ami (TV series, 2013–2014)
Love Alarm (TV series, 2019)

References

External links
 

South Korean webtoon creators
South Korean manhwa artists
South Korean manhwa writers
Living people
1970 births